The Immigration Appellate Authority (IAA) was an independent judicial body in the United Kingdom constituted under the Immigration Act 1971, with jurisdiction to hear appeals from many immigration and asylum decisions.  Administered by the Tribunals Service, it was superseded in 2005 by the Asylum and Immigration Tribunal, which itself was superseded in 2010 by the Asylum and Immigration Chamber of the First-tier Tribunal created by the Tribunals, Courts and Enforcement Act 2007.

Description
The system of appeals to adjudicators appointed by the Home Secretary, with the right of appeal to a body then called the Immigration Appeal Tribunal, with members appointed by the Lord Chancellor, was created by the Immigration Appeals Act 1969. As a result of the Immigration Act 1971, the Immigration Appellate Authority (IAA) became an independent judicial body consisting of two tiers: Immigration Adjudicators and an Immigration Appeal Tribunal (IAT).  The Adjudicators initially considered appeals against decisions made by Immigration Officers, entry clearance officers and the Home Secretary, based in permanent centres in Islington, London, Hatton Cross, Birmingham, Leeds, Manchester and Glasgow.  The Tribunal dealt with applications for leave to appeal and appeals against decisions made by the Immigration Adjudicators, with its main hearing centre in Bream's Buildings, off Chancery Lane in Central London.

The Tribunal was headed by a President, who was required to be a barrister or a solicitor of at least seven years' standing. From 1999, a High Court judge was appointed President rather than a member of the IAA. Both lay members and legally-qualified members were appointed to the IAT.

Presidents of the Immigration Appeal Tribunal 
     -1997: George Farmer
 1997–1999: David Pearl
 1999–2002: Sir Andrew Collins
 2002–2005: Sir Duncan Ouseley

Replacement 
The two tier structure of the Immigration Appellate Authority was abolished by the Asylum and Immigration (Treatment of Claimants, etc.) Act 2004, which created the single tier Asylum and Immigration Tribunal to replace it.  All former adjudicators and members of the IAA became members of the new AIT.  The Home Office Adjudicators became known as Immigration Judges, although many of them were not formally qualified as judges.  The former 'regional adjudicators' became known as Senior Immigration Judges, mostly involved in reconsidering applications for challenging the outcome of  appeals.

See also 
 Immigration to the United Kingdom
 Special Immigration Appeals Commission
 Right of asylum
 Office of the Immigration Services Commissioner

References 

Immigration to the United Kingdom
Former courts and tribunals in the United Kingdom
Right of asylum in the United Kingdom
Asylum tribunals
1971 establishments in the United Kingdom
2010 disestablishments in the United Kingdom
Courts and tribunals established in 1971
Courts and tribunals disestablished in 2010